Samuel Hannes Haanpää (born 27 September 1986) is a Finnish professional basketball player.

Born in Kerava, Haanpää attended Valparaiso University in the United States, where he played college basketball between 2006 and 2008. After graduating from college, Haanpää has played for several professional clubs around Europe.

References

1986 births
Living people
Borås Basket players
Finnish expatriate basketball people in Spain
Finnish expatriate basketball people in the United States
Finnish men's basketball players
Fos Provence Basket players
Keravnos B.C. players
Kobrat players
KTP-Basket players
Obras Sanitarias basketball players
Palencia Baloncesto players
Torpan Pojat players
Valparaiso Beacons men's basketball players
Forwards (basketball)